The San Diego International Film Festival is an independent film festival held annually in San Diego. The festival's top honorary award is the Gregory Peck Award for Cinematic Excellence that has been presented at the festival by the family of Gregory Peck since 2014. The festival also presents the Chris Brinker Award to first time directors.  Those and other honorary and competitive awards presented by and at the festival are here organized by year and by award.

Film Competition Award Winners By Year

SDiFF2022 
Oct 19-23, 2022

 Artistic Director's Award: American Murderer (dir. Matthew Gentile)
 Best Gala Film: The Banshees of Inisherin
 Best Feature Film: Freedom's Path
 Best Documentary: With This Breath I Fly
 Best International Feature: The Woman In the White Car
 Best Drama Feature: What We Do Next
 Best Comedy Feature: Róise & Frank
 Best Women's Film Series: The Moon & Back
 Best Ensemble Cast: Bleecker
 Best Short Doc: For the Bees
 Best Short Narrative: Shower Boys
 Best International Short Film: The Red Suitcase
 Best Animation: Tehura
 Kumeyaay Award: The Wind & the Reckoning
 Best Local Film: Don't Do It
 Best Student Film: Black Whole
Valor Award: Mending the Line (dir. John Waller)
Audience Choice Awards:
 Audience Choice Feature: The Wind & the Reckoning
 Audience Choice Doc: Love, Charlie: The Rise and Fall of Chef Charlie Trotter
 Audience Choice Short: Moon
 Audience Choice Gala: The Banshees of Inisherin

SDiFF2021 
Oct 14-24, 2021

 Best Feature Film: Queen of Glory (dir. Nana Mensah)
 Best Documentary Feature: Holy Frit (dir. Justin Monroe)
 Best International Feature: Petite Maman (dir. Céline Sciamma)
 Best Thriller Feature: The Boathouse (dir. Hannah Cheesman)
 Best Drama Feature: The Beta Test (dir. Jim Cummings)
 Best Comedy Feature: They/Them/Us (dir. Jon Sherman)
 Best Ensemble Cast: Voodoo Macbeth
 Best Short Doc: The Bitter Root
 Best International Short: Good Morning, Ignacio (dir. Alan Jonsson Gavica & Leticia Fabián)
 Best Animation: Freebird
 Kumeyaay Award: Pictures of My People (dir. Mark Ruberg)
 Military Award: Do Not Hesitate
 Best Local Film: Cheyenne
 Best Student (College): Cheyenne
 Best Student (High School): Mazel Tov
 Chris Brinker Award: Women is Losers (dir. Lissette Feliciano)\
Audience Choice Awards:
 Audience Choice Feature: Somos Ecos
 Audience Choice Doc: The Disruptors (dir. Stephanie Soechtig)
 Audience Choice Short: Munkie (dir. Steven Chow)
 Audience Choice Gala: Belfast (dir. Kenneth Branagh)

SDiFF2020 
Oct 15-18, 2020

 Best Narrative Feature: Drunk Bus (dir. John Carlucci and Brandon LaGanke)
 Best Documentary: MLK/FBI (dir. Sam Pollard)
 Best International Feature: 150 Million Magical Sparrows (dirs. Brahmanand S. Singh, Tanvi Jain)
 Best Thriller Feature: Through the Glass Darkly (dir. Lauren Fash)
 Best Drama Feature: Farewell Amor (dir. Ekwa Msangi)
 Best Comedy Feature: Eat Wheaties! (dir. Scott Abramovitch)
 Best Ensemble Cast: Before/During/After (dir. Stephen Kunken, Jack Lewars)
 Best Short Documentary: Panthoot (dir. Richard Reens)
 Best Short Narrative: Last Queen on Earth (dir. Michael Shumway)
 Best International Short Film: Chen Chen (dir. Kargo Chen)
 Best Animation: To: Gerard (dir. Taylor Meacham)
Kumeyaay Award: Invasion: The Unist'ot'en's Fight for Sovereignty (dirs. Michael Toledano, Sam Vinal)
Best Local Film: Anna (dir. Rich Underwood)
 Chris Brinker Award: The MisEducation of Bindu (dir. Prarthana Mohan)
Artistic Director's Award: You Asked for the Facts: Bobby Kennedy at the Univ of Mississippi
Audience Choice Awards:
 Audience Choice Documentary: The Mustangs: America's Wild Horses
 Audience Choice Short: Feeling Through (dir. Doug Roland)
 Audience Choice Gala: Nomadland
 Audience Choice Feature: Drunk Bus

SDiFF2019 
Oct 15-20, 2019

 Best Narrative Feature : The Steed (dir. Erdenebileg Ganbold)
Best Documentary: Breaking Their Silence: Women on the Frontline of the Poaching War (dir. Kerry David)
Best Short Film: Long Time Listener, First Time Caller (dir. Nora Kirkpatrick)
 Best International Short Film: Portraitist (dir. Cyrus Neshvad)
 Best Animation: Riptide
 Best Global Cinema: Philophobia (dir. Guy Davies)
 Kumeyaay Award: Angelique's Isle (dir. Marie-Hélène Cousineau, Michelle Derosier)
 Best Ensemble Cast: Inside Game (dir. Randall Batinkoff)
Best Original Screenplay: Love in Kilnerry (dir. Daniel Keith)
 Best World Premiere: 100 Days to Live (dir. Ravin Gandhi)
 Best Student Film: Sonora
 Best Local Film: Flourish (dir. Christopher Allan Francis, Nicole Franco)
 Best Comedy Film: Babysplitters (dir. Sam Friedlander)
 Best Thriller: Safe Inside (dir. Renata Gabryjelska)
Litecoin Filmmaker Award: Philophobia
 Artistic Director's Award: Safe Spaces (dir. Daniel Schechter)

Audience Choice Awards:

 Studio Film: Marriage Story (dir. Noah Baumbach)
 Feature Film: Carol of the Bells (dir. Joey Travolta)
 Documentary: Breaking Their Silence, Women on the Frontline of the Poaching War (dir. Kerry David)
 Short Film: Men of Vision (dir. Frank Todaro)

SDiFF2018 

Oct 10-14, 2018 | Jury Awards:

 Best Animation: The Driver is Red (dir. Randall Christopher)
 Best Student Film: Learning to Swim
 Best Global Cinema: My Name is "Batlir", Not Butler (dir. Stare Yildirim)
 Kumeyaay Award: Indian Horse
Most Inspirational Film: The Push (dir. Grant Korgan, Brian Niles)
Best World Premiere: Electric Love (dir. Aaron Fradkin)
Best Local Film: Daisy Belle (dir. William Wall)
Best Local Breakout: Romance is Dead (dir. Todd Jackson)
Best Short Film: Akeda (dir. Dan Bronfield)
Best Short Comedy Film: Hero (dir. Drew and Nate Garcia)
Best Documentary: Stroop: Journey into the Rhino Horn War
Best Thriller: Rust Creek 
Best Breakout Feature: I May Regret (dir. Graham Streeter)
Best Feature Film: Tiger
Artistic Directors' Award: Soufra (dir. Thomas A. Morgan)

Audience Choice Awards:

 Best Documentary: Soufra
 Best Feature: I May Regret
 Best Short: Your Call Is Important To Us
 Best Studio: Boy Erased

SDiFF2017 

Oct 4-8, 2017 | Jury Awards:

 Best Narrative Feature: The Bachelors (dir. Kurt Voelker) 
Best Documentary: The Last Animals 
Best Short Film: The Foster Portfolio 
Best Foreign Short: Ostoja Will Move Your Piano 
 Best Animated Short: Green Light (dir. Seong-Min Kim)
 Best Global Cinema: The Divine Order
 Kumeyayy Eagle Award: Waabooz (dir. Molly Katagiri)
 Best Military Film: Apache Warrior (dir. David Salzberg, Christian Tureaud)
 Best Ensemble Film: Butterfly Caught (dir. Manny Rodriguez Jr.)
 Best World Premiere: Dismissed (dir. Benjamin Arfmann)
 Best Comedy Feature: The Lonely Italian (dir. Lee Farber)
 Best Breakthrough Feature: Selling Isobel
 Chairman's Award: Dog Years (dir. Adam Rifkin)

Audience Choice Awards:

 Best Documentary: Resistance is Life (dir. Apo W. Bazidi)
 Best Feature: Life Hack
 Best Short: The Dog With the Woman (dir. Phoebe Arnstein, Stephen Ledger-Lomas)
 Best Studio: Three Billboards Outside Ebbing, Missouri

SDiFF2016 

Sept 28-Oct 2, 2016 | Jury Awards:

 Best Narrative Short: Bon Voyage (dir. Marc Raymond Wilkin)
 Best Comedy: The Late Bloomer (dir. Kevin Pollak)
 Best Military Film: Railway Spine (dir. Samuel Gonzalez, Jr.)
 Kumeyayy Eagle Award: Te Ata (dir. Nathan Frankowski)
 Best Documentary: Political Animals
 Best International Film: Julieta (dir. Pedro Almodovar)
 Breakthrough Feature: Po
 Chairman's Award: Citizen Soldier (dir. David Salzberg, Christian Tureaud)
 Best Narrative Feature: So B. It
 Breakthrough Documentary: In Utero

Audience Choice Awards:

 Best Documentary: Seed: The Untold Story
 Best International Film: The Cliff (Acantilado) 
 Best Narrative Feature: Dead Draw (dir. Brian Klemesrud)
 Best Narrative Short: Mine (dir. Simon Berry)

SDFF2015 
Sep 30-Oct 4, 2015 | Jury Awards:

 Best Narrative Feature – Diablo
 Best Documentary – India's Daughter
 Best International Film – Victoria
 Best Narrative Short – SubRosa (dir. Thora Hilmarsdottir)
 Best Animated Film – SOAR (dir. Alyce Tzue)
 Best Military Film – No Greater Love (dir. Justin Roberts)
 Kumeyaay Award – For Blood (dir. Chadwick Pelletier, John T. Connor)
 Chairman's Award – Kidnap Capital

Audience Choice:

 Best Feature – Moments of Clarity
 Best Documentary – Return to Dak To
 Best Short – The Gunfighter (dir. Eric Kissack)
 Best Gala – He Named Me Malala

SDFF2014 
Sep 24-28, 2014 | Jury Awards:

 Best Narrative Feature: Where the Road Runs Out (dir. Rudolf Buitendach)
 Best Documentary: Waiting for Mamu
 Best International: Schimbarev (dir. Álex Sampayo)
 Best Narrative Short: The Bravest, The Boldest (dir. Moon Molson)
 Best Animated Film: The Dam Keeper
 Kumeyaay Award: Sycuan: Our People. Our Culture. Our History.
U-T San Diego Award: Where the Road Runs Out
 Chairman's Award: The Hornet's Nest

Audience Choice:

 Best Gala Film: The Imitation Game
 Best Feature: Cas & Dylan
 Best Documentary: Waiting for Mamu
 Best Short: Sure Thing
 Best International: Noble

SDFF2013 
Oct 2-6, 2013 | Jury Awards:

 Best Narrative Feature: Autumn Blood
 Best Latin Feature: Dirty Hearts

SDFF2011 

Best Narrative Feature - East Fifth Bliss (dir. Michael Knowles)
 Best Documentary - Semper Fi: Always Faithful (dir. Tony Hardmon & Rachel Libert)
 Best Short Film - It Takes Balls (dir. Benoit Lach)
 Best San Diego Film - Repeat After Me (dir. Bryan Bangerter)
 Best Screenplay - James Westby (Rid of Me) 
 Best Actor - John Turturro, (Somewhere Tonight) 
 Best Actress - Rachel Boston (The Pill)

Audience Choice:

 Best Feature - Like Crazy (dir. Drake Doremus)
 Best Documentary - The Highest Pass, dir. Jon Fitzgerald

SDFF2010 

 Best Narrative Feature - A Little Help
 Best Documentary - Waiting for Superman
 Best Short Film - Touch
 Best San Diego Film - This is Charlotte King, dir. Jeffrey Durkin
 Best Actor - Drew Fuller (The Kane Files: Life in Trial)
 Best Actress - Emily VanCamp (Norman)

Audience Choice:

 Best Feature - Nowhere Boy
 Best Documentary - Waiting for Superman

SDFF2009 

 Best Narrative Feature - Formosa Betrayed (dir. Adam Kane)
 Best Documentary - American Harmony 
 Best Short Film - True Beauty This Night 
 Best Music Video - Reilly's "Sunlight" (Dir. David Altrogge)
 Best San Diego Film - Wyland Earth Day (Dir. Chris Marrow) 
 Best Screenplay - Shem Bitterman (The Job) 
 Best Actor - James Van Der Beek (Formosa Betrayed) 
 Best Actress - Mira Sorvino (Like Dandelion Dust)

Audience Choice:

 Best Feature - Reach for Me (dir. LeVar Burton)
 Best Documentary - Jesse's Story (dir. Mark S. Jacobs)

SDFF2008 

 Best Feature - Summerhood (dir. Jacob Medjuck)
 Best Actress - Sasha Alexander - The Last Lullaby
 Best Actor - Michael Tassoni - The Appearance of a Man (dir. Daniel Pace)
 Heineken Red Star Award - The Appearance of a Man
 Physical Graffiti Best Action Sports Story - Against the Grain
 Best Short - In the Name of the Son
 Best Documentary - Uncounted (dir. David Earnhardt)
 Best Music Video - Greg Laswell - How the Day Sounds
 Best San Diego Short - Residue

Audience Choice:

 Best Feature - The Last Lullaby
 Best Documentary - Speed & Angels (dir. Peyton Wilson)

SDFF2007 

Sept 27-30, 2007

 Best Feature Film: Intervention (dir. Mary McGuckian)
 Best Documentary - Kurt Cobain: About A Son
 Best Short - Rory Kindersley, “Slingers”
 Best Director - Alfredo De Villa, Adrift in Manhattan
 Best Screenplay - The Walker, written by Paul Schrader
 Best Cinematography - The Northern Kingdom, Mark Schwartzbard
 Best Actor - Brian Petersen, Coyote
 Best Actress - Dominique Swain, The Pacific & Eddy | Best Actress - Jennifer Tilly (Intervention)
 Best Female Filmmaker - Annie Sunderberg, The Devil Came on Horseback
 Best San Diego Filmmaker - Greg Durbin, “Passing Through”
 Best Music Video - "Paramount" by Deadarm, Cleopatra, Kb. Directed by Carlos Florez
 Heineken Red Star Award - Killing Zelda Sparks

SDFF2006 
Sept. 27 – Oct. 1, 2006

 Best Feature Film - Danika
 Best Director - Jordan Albertsen, The Standard
 Best Screenplay - Tim Boughn, Neo Ned
 Best Documentary --Chasing the Horizon
 Best Short - "Olyver Brody"
 Best Female Filmmaker - Heather MacAllister, The Narrow Gate
 Best Actor - Ryan Donowho, The Favor
 Best Actress - Regina Hall, Danika
 San Diego Filmmaker - "Nothing To Do With Amy"
 Best Music Video - "Just Go", Misdirection
 Best Music Video Director—Fernando Apodaca, "Life Wasted", Pearl Jam

Audience Choice:

 Best Feature - Neo Ned
 Best Documentary - The Creek Runs Red

SDFF2005 
Sept 21-25, 2005

 Best Feature Film - "Innocent Voices," (dir. Luis Mandoki)
 Best Documentary - "Earthlings," (dir. Shaun Monson)
 Best Short Film - "Apartment 206," (dir. Gregory Zymet)
 Best Screenplay - "When Do We Eat," (dir. Nina Davidovich & Salvador Litvak)
 Best Actor - Carlos Padilla Lenero, "Innocent Voices"
 Best Actress - Felicity Huffman, "Transamerica"
 Best Director - Christopher Jaymes, "In Memory of My Father"
 San Diego Feature Film - "Everyone Their Grain of Sand", (dir. Elizabeth Bird)
 San Diego Filmmaker – Canaan Brumley, "Ears, Open. Eyeballs, Click."
 Crystal Vision – Gable-Cook-Schmid Public Relations

Audience Choice:

Best Feature - "The Matador," (dir. Richard Shepard)
 Best Documentary - "Little Man," (dir. Nicole Conn )

SDFF2004 
Sept 29 - Oct 4, 2004

 Best Feature - Around the Bend, dir. Jordan Roberts
 Best Documentary - Sonny Boy, Soleil Moon Frye
 Best Short – American Made, dir. Sharat Raju
 Best Director – Black Cloud, Rick Shroeder
 Best Screenplay – Celeste Davis (Purgatory House)
 SD Screenwriting Contest Winner – "Whitefish", George Olson
 Best Actor - James Russo (The Box)
 Best Actress - Sally Andrews (Her Majesty)
 Best San Diego Feature Film - Never Been Done, (dir. Matthew Powers)
 Best San Diego Filmmaker - Devin Scott

Night of the Stars Honorees

SDiFF2022 
Oct 20, 2022 | The Conrad Prebys Performing Arts Center in La Jolla

 Gregory Peck Award: Andy Garcia
 Cinema Vanguard: Regina Hall
 Fairbanks: Tony Hale
 Virtuoso Award: Lisa Ann Walker
 Humanitarian Award: Dr. Brook Parker-Bello
 Spotlight Award: Colson Baker
Confirmed Festival Guests: Jung Ryeo-won, Summer Stephan

SDiFF2021 
Oct 14-24, 2021

No awards banquet was held in 2021 due to COVID-19 protocols about social distancing.

SDiFF2020 
No awards banquet was held in 2020 due to COVID-19 protocols about social distancing.

SDiFF2019 
Oct 18, 2019 | Pendry Hotel San Diego

Host: Scott Mantz

Gregory Peck Award: Laurence Fishburne
Humanitarian Award: Lindsay Wagner
 Cinema Vanguard: Jared Harris
Music Icon Award: Pitbull (not present)
 Fairbanks Award: Jillian Bell
Rising Star Award: Camila Morrone
Chris Brinker Award: Ravin Gandhi

Confirmed Festival Guests: Stephen Gyllenhaal, Cindy Marten.

SDiFF2018 
Oct 11, 2018 | Pendry Hotel San Diego

Host: Scott Mantz

Gregory Peck Award: Keith Carradine
 Music Icon Award: Kenny Loggins
Cinema Vanguard Award: Topher Grace
Fairbanks Award: Kathryn Hahn
Nemeth Humanitarian Award: Zachary Levi
Spotlight Award: John Cho
Auteur Award: Alex Wolff
 Rising Star Award: Christian Navarro
Chris Brinker Award: Stare Yildirim

Confirmed Festival Guests: Hal Linden, Nat Wolff, Jassa Ahluwalia

SDiFF2017 

Oct 5, 2017 | Pendry Hotel San Diego

Host: Jeffrey Lyons Co-hosts: Ben Lyons, Scott Mantz

Gregory Peck Award: Patrick Stewart
 Auteur Award: Kumail Nanjiani
 Virtuoso Award: Heather Graham
 Visionary Filmmaker Award: Taran Killam
 Rising Star Award: Blake Jenner
Chris Brinker Award: Manny Rodriguez

Confirmed Festival Guests: Rian Johnson, Nick Eversman (presenter)

SDiFF2016 
Sept 29th, 2016 | Museum of Contemporary Art

Host: Jeffrey Lyons Co-hosts: Ben Lyons, Scott Mantz

Gregory Peck Award: Annette Bening
 Auteur Award: Simon Helberg
 Cinema Vanguard Award: Kate Beckinsale
 Rising Star Award: Jason Mitchell
 Chris Brinker Award: Anne Hamilton

Confirmed Festival Guests: Warren Beatty, Kevin Pollak, Josie Totah (as JJ Totah), Sean Patrick Flanery, Kweku Mandela

SDFF2015 
Oct 1, 2015 - Museum of Contemporary Art

Host: Jeffrey Lyons

 Reframed Humanitarian Award: Geena Davis
 Cinema Vanguard Award: Adrien Brody
 Auteur Award: Brit Marling
 Rising Star Award: John Boyega
 Chris Brinker Award: Jack Robbins

Confirmed Festival Guest: Mika Haka, Leslee Udwin, Roger Ross Williams, Dawn Porter

SDFF2014 
Sept 25, 2014 | Museum of Contemporary Art

Gregory Peck Award: Alan Arkin
Cinema Vanguard Award: Beau Bridges
Excellence In Acting: Michele Monaghan
Visionary Filmmaker Award: Eli Roth
Virtuoso Award: Alison Pill
American Legacy Award: Saginaw Grant
Chris Brinker Award: John Hill

Confirmed Festival Guests: Tom Berenger, Josh Duhamel, Dennis Haysbert, Stelio Savante

SDFF2013 
Oct 3, 2013 | Museum of Contemporary Art

 Humanitarian Award: Mariel Hemingway
 Visionary Filmmaker Award: Judd Apatow
Emerging Producer Award: Justin Nappi

Confirmed Festival Guests: Michael B. Jordan, Troy Duffy

SDFF2012 
Sept 27, 2012 | Museum of Contemporary Art

 Visionary Filmmaker Award: Gus Van Sant

Confirmed Guests: Robin Williams, Ben Affleck, Diane Ladd, Anne Heche, Pennie Lane, Stephen Gyllenhaal, Martin McDonagh, Mark Christopher Lawrence

SDFF2011 
Sep 28-Oct 2

Confirmed Guests: Will Reiser, Tom Sizemore, Lee Hirsch

SDFF2010 
Sept 20, 2010

Confirmed Guests: Jenna Fischer, Kim Coates, Leland Orser, Davis Guggenheim, Jason Ritter and Elliott Gould.

SDFF2009 

 Indie Icon Award - Seymour Cassel

Confirmed Guests: William Shatner, Richard Dreyfuss, James Van Der Beek, James Cromwell

SDFF2005 

Sept 24, 2005

 Lifetime Achievement Award: Joan Collins
 Humanitarian Award: Joaquin Phoenix
 David Angell Humanitarian Award: John Walsh
 Soaring Star Award: Colin Hanks
 Discover Screenwriter Award: Paul Haggis

Confirmed Guests: Melissa Joan Hart, Bryan Greenberg, Ben Younger.

SDFF2004 

Lifetime Achievement Award - Cliff Robertson
 Governor's Award - Phyllis Diller

SDFF2002 
Achievement in Acting Award: James Woods

Confirmed Festival Guests: Kevin Smith, Jeff Anderson, Rod Lurie, Tatum O’Neal, Cliff Robertson, Joey Lauren Adams and Scott Baio

By award

Golden Eagles

Best Narrative Feature 

 2022: Freedom's Path
 2021: Queen of Glory (dir. Nana Mensah)
 2020: Drunk Bus (dir. John Carlucci and Brandon LaGanke)
 2019: The Steed (dir. Erdenebileg Ganbold)
 2018: Tiger (dir. Alisteir Grierson)
 2017: The Bachelors (dir. Kurt Voelker)
 2016: So B. It (dir. Stephen Gyllenhaal)
 2015: Diablo (dir. Lawrence Roeck)
 2014: Where the Road Runs Out (dir. Rudolf Buitendach)

Best Documentary 

 2022: With This Breath I Fly
 2021: Petite Maman (dir. Céline Sciamma)
 2020: MLK/FBI
 2019: Breaking Their Silence: Women on the Frontline of the Poaching War (dir. Kerry David)
 2018: Stroop: Journey into the Rhino Horn War (dir. Susan Scott)
 2017: The Last Animals (dir. Kate Brooks)
 2016: Political Animals (dirs. Tracy Wares, Jonah Markowitz)
 2015: India's Daughter (dir. Leslee Udwin)
 2014: Waiting for Mamu (dir. Thomas A. Morgan)

Best Animation 

 2022: Tehura
 2021: Freebird
 2020: To: Gerard (dir. Taylor Meacham)
 2019: Riptide
 2018: The Driver is Red (dir. Randall Christopher)
 2017: Green Light (dir. Seong-Min Kim)
 2015: SOAR (dir. Alyce Tzue)
 2014: The Dam Keeper (dir. Robert Kondo)

Kumeyaay Eagle Award 

for Best Native American Film
 2022: The Wind & the Reckoning (dir. David L. Cunningham)
 2021: Pictures of My People (dir. Mark Ruberg)
 2020: Invasion: The Unist'ot'en's Fight for Sovereignty (dirs. Michael Toledano, Sam Vinal)
 2019: Angelique's Isle (dir. Marie-Hélène Cousineau, Michelle Derosier)
 2018: Indian Horse (dir. Stephen Campanelli)
 2017: Waabooz (dir. Molly Katagiri)
 2016: Te Ata (dir. Nathan Frankowski)
 2015: For Blood (dir. Chadwick Pelletier, J.T. Connor)
 2014: Sycuan: Our People. Our Culture. Our History.

Audience Awards

Best Documentary 

 2022: Holy Frit (dir. Justin Monroe)
 2021: The Disruptors (dir. Stephanie Soechtig)
 2020: The Mustangs: America's Wild Horses
 2019: Breaking Their Silence: Women on the Frontline of the Poaching War (dir. Kerry David)
 2018: Soufra (dir. Thomas A. Morgan)
 2017: Resistance is Life (dir. Apo W. Bazidi)
 2016: Seed: The Untold Story (dir. Taggart Siegel)
 2015: Moments of Clarity (dir. Stev Elam)
 2014: Waiting for Mamu
 2011: The Highest Pass (dir. Jon Fitzgerald)
 2010: Waiting for Superman (dir. Davis Guggenheim)
 2009: Jesse's Story (dir. Mark S. Jacobs)
 2008: Speed & Angels (dir. Peyton Wilson)
 2006: The Creek Runs Red (dirs. B. Beesley, J. Brannum)
 2005: "Little Man," (dir. Nicole Conn )

Best Narrative Feature 

 2022: The Wind & the Reckoning
 2021: Somos Ecos (dir. Julian Diaz Velosa)
 2020: Drunk Bus
 2019: Carol of the Bells (dir. Joey Travolta)
 2018: I May Regret
 2017: Life Hack
 2016: Dead Draw (dir. Brian Klemesrud)
 2015: Moments of Clarity (dir. Stev Elam)
 2014: Cas & Dylan (dir. Jason Priestley)
 2013: Autumn Blood (dir. Markus Blunder)
 2011: Like Crazy (dir. Drake Doremus)
 2010: Nowhere Boy (dir. Sam Taylor-Johnston)
 2009: Reach for Me (dir. LeVar Burton)
 2008: The Last Lullaby (dir. Jeffrey Goodman)
 2006: Neo Ned (dir. Van Fischer)
 2005: The Matador (dir. Richard Shepard)

Best Narrative Short 

 2022: Moon 
 2021: Munkie (dir. Steven Chow)
 2020: Feeling Through (dir. Doug Roland)
 2019: Men of Vision
 2018: Your Call Is Important To Us
 2017: The Dog With the Woman (dir. P., S. Ledger-Lomas)
 2016: Mine (dir. Simon Berry)
 2015:The Gunfighter (dir. Eric Kissack)
 2014: Sure Thing

Best Studio/Gala Film 

 2022: The Banshees of Inisherin (dir. Martin McDonagh)
 2021:  Belfast (dir. Kenneth Branagh)
 2020: Nomadland (dir. Chloe Zhao)
 2019: Marriage Story (dir. Noah Baumbach)
 2018: Boy Erased (dir. Joel Edgerton)
 2017: Three Billboards Outside Ebbing, Missouri (dir. Martin McDonagh)
 2015: He Named Me Malala (dir. Davis Guggenheim)
 2014: The Imitation Game (dir. Morten Tyldum)

Gregory Peck Award 
 See Gregory Peck Award for Cinematic Excellence

Chris Brinker Award 
For best first time director.
 2020: Prarthana Mohan
 2019: Ravin Gandhi
 2018: Stare Yildirim
 2017: Manny Rodriguez
 2016: Anne Hamilton
 2015: Jack Robbins
 2014: John Hill

Cinema Vanguard Award 

 2022: Regina Hall
 2019: Jared Harris
 2018: Topher Grace
 2016: Kate Beckinsale
 2015: Adrien Brody
 2014: Beau Bridges

Humanitarian Award 

 2022: Dr. Brook Parker-Bello
 2019: Lindsay Wagner
 2018: Zachary Levi
 2015: Geena Davis
 2013: Muriel Hemingway
 2005: Joaquin Phoenix

Fairbanks Award 

 2022: Tony Hale
 2019: Jillian Bell
 2018: Kathryn Hahn

Virtuoso Award 

 2022: Lisa Ann-Walter
 2017: Heather Graham
 2014: Alison Pill

Auteur Award 

 2018: Alex Wolff
 2017: Kumail Nanjiani
 2016: Simon Helberg
 2015: Brit Marling

Music Icon Award 

 2019: Pitbull
 2018: Kenny Loggins

Spotlight Award 

 2022: Colson Baker
 2018: John Cho

Rising Star Award 

 2019: Camila Morrone
 2018: Christian Navarro
 2017: Blake Jenner
 2016: Jason Mitchell
 2015: John Boyega
 2005: Colin Hanks (Soaring Star)

References

External Links 

 Official Site

Lists of films by award
Film festivals in San Diego
International film awards
Film